Hayward Augustus Harvey (January 17, 1824 – August 28, 1893) was an American inventor and industrialist.

Biography 
Hayward A. Harvey was born in Jamestown, New York on January 17, 1824. He was educated at the Poughkeepsie Academy and the Academy of New Paltz.

He was married twice, to Matilda Winant and Emily A. Halsey. He had one son by each marriage.

He is best known for inventing the Harvey process for case hardening the front surface of steel armor plate.  The resulting Harvey armor was widely used on armoured ships in the 1890s. He invented the process while living in Orange, New Jersey, and died there on August 28, 1893.

Patents 
 , Manufacture of Steel Rails for Railroads
 , Improvement in Compositions for Super-carburizing Steel
 , Improvements in Decrementally-Hardened Armor-Plates 
 , Gun
 , Spring-washer

References

Further reading 
 Memoir of Hayward Augustus Harvey by Thomas William Harvey. T.W. Harvey, 1900.

1824 births
1893 deaths
People from Jamestown, New York
19th-century American inventors
People from Orange, New Jersey
Engineers from New York (state)
Engineers from New Jersey